Karakulam is a panchayat in Nedumangad Taluk in  Tiruvananthapuram District in the state of Kerala, India. It is the most populated panchayat in the district according to 2011 census.

Location

Karakulam is located approximately 12km. from the closest major city, Thiruvananthapuram. The Karakulam Panchayat neighbours the Thiruvananthapuram Corporation. It lies on Thiruvananthapuram–Sengottai road. The nearest town is Nedumangadu, which is approximately 6km away.

Transport to the Village

There are good transportation facilities from the city, with State Transport buses plying through this village frequently en route to Nedumangadu, Vithura, Ponmudi and various other places. The nearest railway station and airport are Thiruvananthapuram Central Railway Station (11 km) and Trivandrum International Airport (15 km).

Demographics
 India census, Karakulam had a population of 26639 with 13149 males and 13490 females.

Locations of Religious Significance

There are many temples, churches and mosques in the village. Among these are  Vadakkedam (Enikkara) Shiva Temple, Thekkedam Vishnu Temple, Mudisasthamcodu Devi temple (Aaraamkallu),  Pathiyanadu Sree Bhadrakali Temple, Karakulam devi temple,  Ayanikkadu Mudippura Temple, Moodisasthamkode Temple, Thirumanoor Sri Mahadeva Temple, Karakulam Muslim Jama'ath (mosque), St Joseph’s Church and St Augustine’s Church (Aruvikkara).

Mudisasthamcodu Devi temple

Pathiyanadu Sree Bhadrakali Temple 

The Pathiyanadu Sree Bhadrakali Temple is a highly revered shrine in Kerala. It is located in Mullassery, approximately 1.5 kilometres (0.93 miles) from Karakulam. It is 12.5 kilometres (7.8 miles) from Thiruvananthapuram. The temple is managed by Pathiyanadu Sree Bhadrakali Kshetram Trust.

Tesla Pedagogy Park
The Tesla Pedagogy Park is an educational endeavour that promotes science and technology, providing a place for school children to observe and perform experiments.

References

Villages in Thiruvananthapuram district